The Young Greens of Canada are the youth wing of the Green Party of Canada and were formed at the 2006 leadership convention. The Young Greens of Canada's membership consists of youth aged 14 to 29 years of age. All Green Party of Canada members in good standing, between the ages of 14 and 29, are eligible to vote on Young Greens Council elections every year. The Young Greens have campus clubs and regional clubs established across Canada. The wing works with the Green Party leader, Elizabeth May and MPs.

History

The Young Greens of Canada were formed at the 2006 national convention in Ottawa. A constitutional resolution moving that two Youth Co-Chairs seat be created on Federal Council (Section 7.3.13), and the second, a directive resolution moving that a standing committee on youth involvement in the party be created.

The standing committee on youth involvement had their first meeting in a packed corner of an Elephant and Castle pub and restaurant; during which it was decided that a Youth Caucus Development Committee (YCDC) would best meet the need of developing an appropriate Constitution, job descriptions for Council positions, and means of electing the members of a Young Greens Council.

The first Young Greens Council elections were held for 2007. The Young Greens Council announced a binding constitutional referendum to amend their constitution for the first time on November 26, 2008. Young Greens voted on this constitutional reform online between December 27 and 29, 2008. In the case of a constitutional referendum, approval must be made by 66% of voters for amendments to come into effect.

Principles

Principles 
The Young Greens of Canada follows the Green Party of Canada and Global Greens' six key principles, which were adopted at the 2002 convention of the Global Greens. These principles are:
 ecological wisdom
 non-violence
 social justice
 sustainability
 participatory democracy
 respect for diversity

Young Greens Executive Council

The Young Greens of Canada Council is the governing body of the Young Greens of Canada. Councilors have two-year terms and represent Green Party of Canada members who are under 30. The Young Greens Council also has two representatives on the Green Party of Canada's Federal Council. The Young Greens Council make strategic decisions regarding youth engagement and outreach.

Council 2018-2019 
Co-Chairs and Youth Representatives on the Green Party of Canada's Federal Council:

Avery Velez & Stuart Hunter

Alberta Representative:

Max Stronge

British Columbia Representative:

Joel Woznow

Manitoba Representative:

Bryanne Lamoureux

New Brunswick Representative:

Delaney Crawford

Newfoundland and Labrador Representative:

Alexandra Hayward

Nova Scotia Representative:

Karyn MacPherson

Ontario Representative:

Jeremy Leite

Quebec Representative:

Grace Tarabey

Prince Edward Island Representative:

Jonathan Williams

Saskatchewan Representative:

Tracey Moody

Campus & Regional Clubs

Campus Clubs 
 University of Victoria
 University of Ottawa
 Concordia University
 Simon Fraser University 
 Nipissing University
 University of Guelph
 University of New Brunswick-Fredericton
 University of the Fraser Valley
 University of Toronto
 McGill University
 University of Montreal
 University of Winnipeg

References

External links
The Young Greens of Canada Website
Young Greens of Canada – Canadian Political Parties and Political Interest Groups – Web Archive created by the University of Toronto Libraries

Green
Green Party of Canada
Canada